1957 Albanian Cup was the ninth season of Albania's annual cup competition. It began in Spring 1957 with the First Round and ended in May 1957 with the Final match. Dinamo Tirana were the defending champions, having won their fifth Albanian Cup last season. The cup was won by Partizani.

The rounds were played in a one-legged format similar to those of European competitions. If the number of goals was equal, the match was decided by extra time and a penalty shootout, if necessary.

First round
Games were played in March, 1957*

 Results unknown

Second round
In this round entered the 16 winners from the previous round. First and second legs were played in March, 1957.

|}

Quarter-finals
In this round entered the 8 winners from the previous round.

|}
+ Puna Shkodër won by corners.

Semi-finals
In this round entered the four winners from the previous round.

|}

Final

References

 Calcio Mondiale Web

External links
 Official website 

Cup
1957 domestic association football cups
1957